One Night Only is a series of professional wrestling events held by the American promotion Impact Wrestling in 2018. Beginning with the 2018 events, the series became exclusive to Global Wrestling Network, rather than be distributed on pay-per-view. All the 2018 events were co-promoted with independent promotions across North America.

Collision in Oklahoma

One Night Only: Collision in Oklahoma was a professional wrestling pay-per-view (PPV) event produced by Impact Wrestling, Imperial Wrestling Revolution and Border City Wrestling released exclusively on Global Wrestling Network. Some of the matches were taped in Shawnee, Oklahoma at IWR's second annual When Worlds Collide show, while others were taped in Windsor, Ontario at BCW's annual Excellence event.

Canadian Clash

One Night Only: Canadian Clash was a professional wrestling pay-per-view (PPV) event produced by Impact Wrestling to be released exclusively on Global Wrestling Network. The event included matches taped during Border City Wrestling's annual Excellence event as well as BCW Motown Showdown.

March Breakdown

One Night Only: March Breakdown was a professional wrestling pay-per-view (PPV) event produced by Impact Wrestling in conjunction with Border City Wrestling to be released exclusively on Global Wrestling Network.

Cali Combat

One Night Only: Cali Combat was a professional wrestling pay-per-view (PPV) event produced by Impact Wrestling in conjunction with Big Time Wrestling to be released exclusively on Global Wrestling Network.

Zero Fear

One Night Only: Zero Fear was a professional wrestling pay-per-view (PPV) event produced by Impact Wrestling in conjunction with Destiny World Wrestling to be released exclusively on Global Wrestling Network.

Bad Intentions

One Night Only: Bad Intentions was a professional wrestling pay-per-view (PPV) event produced by Impact Wrestling in conjunction with Destiny World Wrestling to be released exclusively on Global Wrestling Network.

Night of the Dummies

One Night Only: Night of the Dummies was a professional wrestling pay-per-view (PPV) event produced by Impact Wrestling in conjunction with Xcite Wrestling to be released exclusively on Global Wrestling Network.

BCW 25th Anniversary

One Night Only: BCW 25th Anniversary was a professional wrestling pay-per-view (PPV) event produced by Impact Wrestling in conjunction with Border City Wrestling to be released exclusively on Global Wrestling Network.

Back to Cali

One Night Only: Back to Cali was a professional wrestling pay-per-view (PPV) event produced by Impact Wrestling in conjunction with Big Time Wrestling to be released exclusively on Global Wrestling Network.

References

2018 in professional wrestling
Professional wrestling in Oklahoma
2018 in Oklahoma
2018 in Ontario
Events in Ontario
Events in Oklahoma
2018
Professional wrestling in Ontario